"South Side" is a song written and recorded by American electronica musician Moby. It was released to radio on October 10, 2000, as the seventh single from his fifth studio album, Play. Initially recorded with No Doubt frontwoman Gwen Stefani, production problems forced Moby to leave Stefani's vocals off the mix of the song included on Play; Stefani's vocals were then restored for the song's single release. The drums are sampled from "What's Up Front That Counts" by the Counts.

Although "South Side" was not released in Europe or Australia, it is one of Moby's most commercially successful singles in North America, becoming his only solo single to appear on the US Billboard Hot 100, where it peaked at number 14. In Canada, the song reached number three on the Canadian Singles Chart.

Background
In April 2005, Moby stated that "South Side" was inspired by his visits to Chicago and his love for its house music scene, but that its lyrics are intended to be unsettling and imply a connection between getting used to loud music as part of clubbing, and desensitization to violence. Speaking to Rolling Stone on the tenth anniversary of its release, he described it as "essentially a song about abject amorality", as well as a "happy sing-along pop song about kids that become so inured to violence and become so desensitized that nothing gets through to them. It's about people who have become so over-exposed to stimuli that nothing matters to them anymore."

During the recording sessions for Moby's fifth studio album Play, Gwen Stefani, lead singer of the rock band No Doubt, offered to perform guest vocals for "South Side". Around the time of the song's recording, No Doubt had recently achieved substantial commercial success with their album Tragic Kingdom, and Moby reflected that he "couldn't figure out why she'd want to go into the studio with me. She was a big rock star and I was a has-been." Moby was impressed by her vocal performance, but he struggled to produce an adequate mix of the song with her vocals, and ultimately left them off the version included on Play.

Release
"South Side" originally appeared as the fifth track on Play. Moby had managed to tap a friend of his to produce a new mix of "South Side", and for the single release, Stefani's vocals were restored to the song, as originally intended. It was first sent to modern rock and adult contemporary radio in October 2000 and was aired by top 40 stations the following month.

Chart performance
The song was not released as a single in Europe or Australia, but it was a chart hit in North America. In the United States, the song debuted at number 94 on the Billboard Hot 100 chart dated December 2, 2000. The song broke the top 40 on January 6, 2001, climbing to number 37. On the week of May 26, the song reached its peak position of number 14, then exited the chart from number 46 seven weeks later, on the chart dated July 14. Altogether, it stayed on the Hot 100 for 32 weeks and appeared at number 33 on Billboards year-end chart for 2001. It was Moby's only appearance on the Hot 100 until 2018, when he appeared as a featured artist on A$AP Rocky's song "A$AP Forever". "South Side" also made appearances on several other Billboard charts, including the Modern Rock Tracks chart—where it reached number three—and the Adult Top 40 chart—where it peaked at number eight.

In Canada, "South Side" was more successful, becoming Moby's second single to chart on the country's prominent national chart, after "Porcelain" on the recently ceased RPM Top Singles chart. It debuted and peaked at number three on the Canadian Singles Chart on December 9, 2000, then moved down to number four the following week. It remained in the top 10 for a further 11 weeks, exiting the top 20 on March 31. It re-entered the chart on the weeks dated April 7–April 14 and April 28, and it spent 19 weeks on Canada's chart in total.

Music video
The music video was directed by Joseph Kahn and parodies hip hop and dance music videos. Scenes include Moby in garish fur coats and sunglasses, Moby and Stefani dancing in front of large neon signs of their names, and Moby "traveling" in a convertible with women and bottles of champagne, but the vehicle is not even actually being driven outside of the studio. The video also parodies artful videos with scenes of Moby and Stefani in a bare room, wearing drab clothing and holding a potted sunflower, visually parodying the New York "brick and plant" type of set commonly overused in videos and film.

Other elements observed in the video include Moby expressing discomfort for the fake gold insert used over his teeth. Eventually, he grudgingly adjusts it and walks off the set. Stefani is shown in one scene in front of the neon sign with her name wielding three-inch fingernails. Later, she interrupts the filming (to Moby's feigned disgust) to answer and talk on her cell phone.

Instead of a band, in the background of the video, six "musicians" at translucent computer workstations are shown. The workstation users are visually boring and a poor substitute for the presence of an actual band. The workers act as if they are playing and adjusting the electronica music samples in real-time on their keyboards during the performance, with no apparent enthusiasm whatsoever for the actual music being created. At the end of the video it shows a pot of mayonnaise and burning clothes falling from a rack.

The music video won the 2001 MTV Video Music Award for Best Male Video. Coincidentally, Stefani was also a featured singer in the winner for Best Female Video, "Let Me Blow Ya Mind" by Eve.

Track listings
 CD single 
 "South Side"  – 3:25
 "South Side"  – 3:48

 Maxi-CD single 
 "South Side"  – 3:49
 "South Side"  – 8:27
 "South Side"  – 3:48
 "South Side"  – 8:48
 "Ain't Never Learned" – 3:47
 "South Side"  – 7:54
 "The Sun Never Stops Setting" – 4:19

 12-inch single 
 "South Side"  – 8:27
 "South Side"  – 3:49
 "South Side"  – 8:48

Charts

Weekly charts

Year-end charts

Release history

References

External links
 

1999 songs
2000 singles
Gwen Stefani songs
Male–female vocal duets
Moby songs
MTV Video Music Award for Best Male Video
Music videos directed by Joseph Kahn
Mute Records singles
Song recordings produced by Moby
Songs written by Moby
V2 Records singles